Parc Safari is a zoo in Hemmingford, Quebec, Canada, and is one of the region's major tourist attractions; 
Parc Safari, an animal and amusement park was founded in 1972. It currently holds 500 animals of 50 different species. It is located close to the United States and draws many American visitors. It contains many African animals, including zebra, giraffe, dromedary camels, elands, rhinos, wildebeest, ostriches, lions, Ankole-Watusi cattle, and greater kudu. It also has many Asian animals, including Asiatic water buffalo, gaur, tigers, a Bactrian camel, yaks, and many different types of deer. Other animals include bison, llamas, wallabies, guanaco, elk, and wolves.

The park consists of a drive-thru area, where the visitors can get close to the animals and feed them, and walking areas. One of the walking areas is an elevated boardwalk where visitors will see primarily carnivores such as lions, tigers and hyenas, and the other is a wooded area with a Deer Trail and the "Farm of the Five Continents", which displays farm animals from around the world including donkeys, geese and rabbits as well as emus and rheas, fennec foxes, meerkats and maras.  Parc Safari also has a water park: the Tropical Oasis with The Nile River tube ride, a wave pool and large water slides; the Dolphins' Lagoon with smaller water slides and water games for all ages; the Dino wading pool with a small slide and water games for young children.

References

External links

 

Zoos in Quebec
Tourist attractions in Montérégie
1972 establishments in Quebec
Zoos established in 1972
Les Jardins-de-Napierville Regional County Municipality